Ciudad Mante National Airport  is a small airport located in Ciudad Mante, Tamaulipas, Mexico. It is situated in South Tamaulipas and handles regional traffic.

References

External links
 Airport information at World Aero Data

Airports in Tamaulipas